Magnolia mahechae is a species of plant in the family Magnoliaceae. It is endemic to Colombia.

References

mahechae
Endemic flora of Colombia
Taxonomy articles created by Polbot